The 2020 United States Senate election in West Virginia was held on November 3, 2020, to elect a member of the United States Senate to represent the State of West Virginia, concurrently with the 2020 U.S. presidential election, as well as other elections to the United States Senate in other states, elections to the United States House of Representatives and various state and local elections.

Incumbent Republican U.S. Senator Shelley Moore Capito won a second term against Democrat Paula Jean Swearengin by a margin of 43.3%, winning every county, and becoming the first West Virginia Republican to win reelection to the U.S. Senate since Reconstruction.

Swearengin's 27% of the vote is the lowest vote percentage for any Democratic Senate candidate in West Virginia history.

Republican primary

Candidates

Nominee
Shelley Moore Capito, incumbent U.S. Senator

Eliminated in primary
Larry Butcher, farmer
Allen Whitt, president of the West Virginia Family Policy Council

Endorsements

Results

Democratic primary
Paula Jean Swearengin won the nomination with 38.8% of the vote in the state's Democratic primary on June 9, 2020.

Candidates

Nominee
 Paula Jean Swearengin, environmental activist and candidate for the U.S. Senate in 2018

Eliminated in primary
 Richard Ojeda, former state senator, nominee for West Virginia's 3rd congressional district in 2018, and former candidate for President of the United States in 2020
Richie Robb, former mayor of South Charleston

Declined
 Mike Pushkin, state delegate
 Earl Ray Tomblin, former Governor of West Virginia

Endorsements

Results

Other candidates

Libertarian Party

Nominee
 David Moran

Independents

Withdrawn
 Franklin Riley

General election

Predictions

Endorsements

Polling

Results

Capito won all 55 of the state's counties for the second election in a row, earning more than 70% of the vote over Swearengin in all but eight counties.

Notes
Partisan clients

Voter samples and additional candidates

References

External links
 
 
  (State affiliate of the U.S. League of Women Voters)
 

Official campaign websites
 Shelley Moore Capito (R) for Senate
 Paula Jean Swearengin (D) for Senate

2020
West Virginia
United States Senate